Cydia duplicana is a small moth of the family Tortricidae. It is found in all across Europe, extending barely into Asia in the Transcaucasus, Turkestan and Kazakhstan.

The wingspan is 13–19 mm. Adults are on wing from May or June to the end of July. There is one generation per year.

The larvae (caterpillars) feed on European silver fir (Abies alba), Norway spruce (Picea abies), junipers (Juniperus) and pines (Pinus). Larvae can be found in resin deposits, thickened cankerous branches infested by fungi and in mechanical injuries of the host plant. The larvae only mine to the nearest injury on the bark.

Synonyms
Junior synonyms of this species are:
 Grapholitha duplicana Zetterstedt, 1839
 Tortrix dahliana Frolich, 1828
 Grapholitha duplicana var. graeca Staudinger, 1871
 Tortrix (Grapholitha) interruptana Herrich-Schffer, 1851
 Grapholita dublicana [sic] ab. major Prohaska, 1922
 Laspeyresia duplicana (Zetterstedt, 1839)

In addition, the specific name interruptana was used in a list of tortrix moths by G.A.W. Herrich-Schäffer in 1848 already. But he did not provide a description then, thus the scientific name – later determined to refer to the same species as J.W. Zetterstedt's Grapholitha duplicana – was validly established by him only in 1851.

Footnotes

References
  (2009): Online World Catalogue of the Tortricidae – Cydia duplicana. Version 1.3.1. Retrieved 2010-APR-20.
  (1942): Eigenartige Geschmacksrichtungen bei Kleinschmetterlingsraupen ["Strange tastes among micromoth caterpillars"]. Zeitschrift des Wiener Entomologen-Vereins 27: 105-109 [in German]. PDF fulltext
  (2005): Markku Savela's Lepidoptera and some other life forms – Cydia duplicana. Version of 2005-SEP-13. Retrieved 2010-APR-19.

External links

 Eurasian Tortricidae

}

Grapholitini
Tortricidae of Europe
Insects of Turkey